Hypatopa umbra is a moth in the family Blastobasidae. It is found in Costa Rica.

The length of the forewings is 3.5–5.1 mm. The forewings are pale brown intermixed with brown scales. The hindwings are translucent pale brown, gradually darkening towards the apex.

Etymology
The specific name is derived from Latin umbra (meaning shadow).

References

Moths described in 2013
Hypatopa